Phillip Cameron Morrison (born 29 December 1984 in São Paulo) is a Brazilian swimmer of American descent, who specialized in freestyle events. He represented his nation Brazil as a member of the freestyle relay team at the 2008 Summer Olympics, and also served as a member of the Stanford Cardinal swimming squad at Stanford University in Stanford, California, where he graduated with a degree in earth systems, major in human biology.

Morrison competed as a member of the Brazilian team in the 4 × 200 m freestyle relay at the 2008 Summer Olympics in Beijing. Despite missing out the individual spot in the 200 m freestyle, he managed to place fourth at the annual Maria Lenk Trophy in Rio de Janeiro (1:49.04) to earn a selection on the relay team. Teaming with Rodrigo Castro, Nicolas Oliveira, and Lucas Salatta in heat one, Morrison swam the third leg with a split of 1:49.35, but the Brazilian team had to settle for last place out of sixteen registered nations in 7:19.54.

References

External links
 
 
 
 Profile – UOL Esporte 
 

1984 births
Living people
Brazilian male freestyle swimmers
Olympic swimmers of Brazil
Swimmers at the 2008 Summer Olympics
Swimmers from São Paulo
Stanford University alumni
20th-century Brazilian people
21st-century Brazilian people